David Sean Branshaw (born September 25, 1969) is an American professional golfer who plays on the PGA Tour Champions. He formerly played on the PGA Tour and the Nationwide Tour (now known as the Korn Ferry Tour).

Branshaw was born in Oswego, New York. He turned professional in 1991, and competed on the Nationwide Tour in 1997, 2002, 2003, and 2005. In 2003, he earned his PGA Tour card by finishing T4 at Q-School. Branshaw struggled in his first year on Tour, and failed to retain his playing card. In 2005, Branshaw finished 7th on the Nationwide Tour money list and regained a spot on the PGA Tour with a win at the 2005 Nationwide Tour Championship.

Branshaw did not play again on the PGA Tour after 2007, when he made only 10 cuts in 30 events and lost his tour card. He played on the Nationwide Tour full-time after that. In 2008, he lost to Ryan Hietala in a playoff in the Cox Classic.

In December 2021, Branshaw secured his card on the PGA Tour Champions through Q-School.

Professional wins (2)

Nationwide Tour wins (2)

Nationwide Tour playoff record (0–2)

See also
2003 PGA Tour Qualifying School graduates
2005 Nationwide Tour graduates

References

External links

American male golfers
PGA Tour golfers
Korn Ferry Tour graduates
Golfers from New York (state)
Bridgewater College alumni
People from Oswego, New York
1969 births
Living people